EWN may refer to:

People 
 Ewn Garabandal (born 1978), Lombard novelist

Other uses 
 Coastal Carolina Regional Airport, North Carolina, United States
 EuroWeekly News, an English-language newspaper in Spain
 Eyewitness News (South Africa), a South African news publisher 
 EuroWorld Network, now eMedia Network, an American media company
 EWNetwork (Etika World Network), Desmond Amofah's YouTube channel between 2012 and 2018

See also
Eyewitness News, a style of news broadcasting